The Antakirinja, otherwise spelt Antakarinya, and alternatively spoken of as the Ngonde, are an indigenous Australian people of South Australia.

Name
Their tribal ethnonym generally signifies "westerners", from andakara / antakiri, apparently meaning 'west,' with the suffix -nja  denoting 'name'.

Language
Antakirinya is a Western Desert language belonging to the Wati language family of the Pama-Nyungan languages.

Country
They lived around the headwaters of four rivers, the Hamilton, Alberga, Wintinna, and Lora, and northwards over the modern border as far as Kulgera in the Northern Territory. Their southern frontiers, just before the start of the gibber desert terrain, ran down to Mount Willoughby, Arckaringa, and the Stuart Range, close to the Kokata territory at Coober Pedy. The line separating them from the Matuntara tribe roughly coincides with the northern reaches of the bluebush plains.

Social organization
The Antakarinya were composed of several hordes.
 Walarangunja (eastern Everard Ranges)
 Kadjilaranda (clan north of the eastern Everard Ranges)

According to Christopher Giles, a Telegrapoh Stationmaster as Charlotte Waters, writing in 1875, they had four class names:
 Parroola
 Panungka
 Booltara
 Koomurra

The marriage relations of the four were tabulated in the following manner:

Alternative names
 Antakarinja, Antakerinya, Antakerrinya, Andagirinja, Andagarinja, Andekerinja (Arrernte pronunciation), Andekarinja, Antekarinja, Andigarinya.
 Andigirinji, Antingari, Andigari, Andgari
 Andegilliga, Andigarina, Antigari, Andigiri, Anjirigna
 Anterrikanya, Antegarinya, Antigerinya, Andjirigna
 Untergerrie
 Aldolinga
 Ngonde
 Tangara
 Yandairunga
 Njuntundjara. (Yankuntjatjarra exonym).
 Walarangunja
 Walarenunga
 Kadjilaranda
 Aluna. (language name for southern bands).

Notes

Citations

Sources

Aboriginal peoples of South Australia